Don Bosco School is a school located in Dimapur, Nagaland, India. It is a Catholic school founded on the teachings of Saint John Bosco and is run by the Salesians of Don Bosco.

History 
Don Bosco School Dimapur opened on 19 March 1985. The property for the school was purchased in 1983.

References

Salesian secondary schools
Private schools in Nagaland
Christian schools in Nagaland
Educational institutions established in 1985
1985 establishments in Nagaland